The Best Horror of the Year: Volume Four is a horror fiction anthology edited by Ellen Datlow that was published on May 1, 2012. It is the fourth in The Best Horror of the Year series.

Contents
The book includes 18 stories, all first published in 2011. The book also includes a summation by Datlow of 2011 publications in the horror fiction market, and a list of honorable mentions for the year. The stories are as follows:

Stephen King: "The Little Green God of Agony"
Leah Bobet: "Stay"
Simon Bestwick: "The Moraine"
Laird Barron: "Blackwood's Baby"
David Nickle: "Looker"
Priya Sharma: "The Show"
Margo Lanagan: "Mulberry Boys"
Brian Hodge: "Roots and All"
A. C. Wise: "Final Girl Theory"
Livia Llewellyn: "Omphalos"
Simon Bestwick: "Dermot"
Alison Littlewood: "Black Feathers"
Chet Williamson: "Final Verse"
Terry Lamsley: "In the Absence of Murdock"
Glen Hirshberg: "You Become the Neighborhood"
John Langan: "In Paris, in the Mouth of Kronos"
Anna Taborska: "Little Pig"
Peter Straub: "The Ballad of Ballard and Sandrine"

External links
 
Book review by Mario Guslandi at The SF Site

2012 anthologies
Horror anthologies
Night Shade Books books